(born , February 5, 1972 in the city of Nishi-Tokyo, Tokyo) is a Japanese comedian. He is most famous for his act in which he mocks a famous Japanese professional wrestler Riki Choshu due to his resemblance. Koriki is a wordplay on Riki's name, meaning something like "little Riki".

Unlike many Japanese comedians, he is not associated with any entertainment agency, though he belongs to a comedian "pro-wrestling" organization, .

On television, he is always seen wearing the same outfit, short bicycle shorts and a far too short T-shirt showing off his protruding belly. He speaks with a very strong lisp (much less so when not in character) and is prone to treating mundane objects (such as his microphone) as wrestling opponents.

As an acting pro wrestler, he uses appropriately strong language, though it is never taken seriously due to his strong lisp.

More recently, he has added Para Para (a Japanese dancing style) to his comedy routine, always to the tune of "Night of Fire", a popular Eurobeat track by Bratt Sinclaire. In 2005, riding the popularity of his act, Koriki was featured in a cover version of Niko's track with Para Para oriented Japanese idol group Hinoi Team, accompanying a video and CD release.

He also tried to add a partner that looked similar to Antonio Inoki, aptly named Antonio Koinoki, but the gimmick failed and his partner faded into obscurity.

He is said to enjoy surfing and billiards, and is known to have sent a resume to Johnny & Associates.

He has also performed as a competitor on Sasuke, having entered five tournaments (15th, 18th, 19th, 20th, 24th), but has never made it past the First Stage. Only in the 18th tournament did he ever manage to clear the first obstacle.

In the anime School Rumble, Choshu makes a cameo appearance in episode 17 doing the Para Para dance with Tsukamoto Tenma who is trying to scare away Harima Kenji.

On December 12, 2010, Choshu made an appearance for All Japan Pro Wrestling and teamed with Ryota Hama in a match, where they defeated Keiji Mutoh and comedian Kannazuki to win the F–1 (Fake–1 Gran Prix) Tag Team Championship. The title is a comedy title and is not officially recognized by the promotion. They lost the title to Manabu Soya and RG on December 11, 2011.

Championships and accomplishments 
All Japan Pro Wrestling
F-1 Tag Team Championship (1 time) – with Ryota Hama1
1Championship not officially recognized by All Japan Pro Wrestling.

References

External links
West Gate Wrestling Federation's profile 

1972 births
Japanese impressionists (entertainers)
Living people
Comedians from Tokyo
People from Nishitōkyō, Tokyo
Sasuke (TV series) contestants
F-1 Tag Team Champions